The 1977 South Carolina Gamecocks baseball team represents the University of South Carolina in the 1977 NCAA Division I baseball season. The Gamecocks played their home games at the new Gamecock Baseball Field. The team was coached by June Raines in his first season at South Carolina.

The Gamecocks lost the College World Series, defeated by the Arizona State Sun Devils in the championship game.

Roster

Schedule and results

! style="" | Regular Season (36–9–1)
|- valign="top"

|- align="center" bgcolor="#ccffcc"
| ||  || Gamecock Baseball Stadium • Columbia, SC || 11–0 || 1–0
|- align="center" bgcolor="#ffcccc"
| || at  || Unknown • Charleston, SC || 1–2 || 1–1
|- align="center" bgcolor="#ccffcc"
| ||  || Gamecock Baseball Stadium • Columbia, SC || 2–1 || 2–1
|- align="center" bgcolor="#ccffcc"
| ||  || Gamecock Baseball Stadium • Columbia, SC || 8–3 || 3–1
|- align="center" bgcolor="#ccffcc"
| ||  || Gamecock Baseball Stadium • Columbia, SC || 10–0 || 4–1
|- align="center" bgcolor="#ccffcc"
| || Virginia Tech || Gamecock Baseball Stadium • Columbia, SC || 1–0 || 5–1
|- align="center" bgcolor="#ccffcc"
| ||  || Gamecock Baseball Stadium • Columbia, SC || 6–1 || 6–1
|- align="center" bgcolor="#ccffcc"
| ||  || Gamecock Baseball Stadium • Columbia, SC || 14–0 || 7–1
|- align="center" bgcolor="#ccffcc"
| ||  || Gamecock Baseball Stadium • Columbia, SC || 8–2 || 8–1
|- align="center" bgcolor="#ccffcc"
| || at  || Red McEwen Field • Tampa, FL || 10–4 || 9–1
|- align="center" bgcolor="#ccffcc"
| || vs  || Red McEwen Field • Tampa, FL || 14–5 || 10–1
|- align="center" bgcolor="#bbbbbb"
| || vs  || Red McEwen Field • Tampa, FL || 8–8 || 10–1–1
|- align="center" bgcolor="#ffcccc"
| || at  || Unknown • St. Petersburg, FL || 5–9 || 10–2–1
|- align="center" bgcolor="#ffcccc"
| || at Eckerd || Unknown • St. Petersburg, FL || 1–11 || 10–3–1
|- align="center" bgcolor="#ffcccc"
| || at  || Henley Field • Lakeland, FL || 3–8 || 10–4–1
|- align="center" bgcolor="#ccffcc"
| ||  || Gamecock Baseball Stadium • Columbia, SC || 9–4 || 11–4–1
|- align="center" bgcolor="#ccffcc"
| ||  || Gamecock Baseball Stadium • Columbia, SC || 5–2 || 12–4–1
|- align="center" bgcolor="#ccffcc"
| || at  || Unknown • Florence, SC || 12–10 || 13–4–1
|- align="center" bgcolor="#ffcccc"
| ||  || Gamecock Baseball Stadium • Columbia, SC || 2–3 || 13–5–1
|- align="center" bgcolor="#ffcccc"
| || North Carolina || Gamecock Baseball Stadium • Columbia, SC || 6–9 || 13–6–1
|- align="center" bgcolor="#ccffcc"
| || at Clemson || Beautiful Tiger Field • Clemson, SC || 2–1 || 14–6–1
|- align="center" bgcolor="#ccffcc"
| ||  || Gamecock Baseball Stadium • Columbia, SC || 13–6 || 15–6–1
|-

|- align="center" bgcolor="#ccffcc"
| || at  || Claude Smith Field • Macon, GA || 2–0 || 16–6–1
|- align="center" bgcolor="#ccffcc"
| || at Mercer || Claude Smith Field • Macon, GA || 4–3 || 17–6–1
|- align="center" bgcolor="#ccffcc"
| || Mercer || Gamecock Baseball Stadium • Columbia, SC || 17–2 || 18–6–1
|- align="center" bgcolor="#ccffcc"
| || Mercer || Gamecock Baseball Stadium • Columbia, SC || 6–2 || 19–6–1
|- align="center" bgcolor="#ccffcc"
| || at North Carolina || Boshamer Stadium • Chapel Hill, NC || 3–0 || 20–6–1
|- align="center" bgcolor="#ffcccc"
| ||  || Gamecock Baseball Stadium • Columbia, SC || 1–3 || 20–7–1
|- align="center" bgcolor="#ccffcc"
| || Jacksonville || Gamecock Baseball Stadium • Columbia, SC || 4–2 || 21–7–1
|- align="center" bgcolor="#ccffcc"
| || Clemson || Gamecock Baseball Stadium • Columbia, SC || 7–6 || 22–7–1
|- align="center" bgcolor="#ccffcc"
| || Clemson || Gamecock Baseball Stadium • Columbia, SC || 7–2 || 23–7–1
|- align="center" bgcolor="#ccffcc"
| ||  || Gamecock Baseball Stadium • Columbia, SC || 16–10 || 24–7–1
|- align="center" bgcolor="#ccffcc"
| ||  || Gamecock Baseball Stadium • Columbia, SC || 5–2 || 25–7–1
|- align="center" bgcolor="#ccffcc"
| || Georgia Southern || Gamecock Baseball Stadium • Columbia, SC || 7–3 || 26–7–1
|- align="center" bgcolor="#ccffcc"
| ||  || Gamecock Baseball Stadium • Columbia, SC || 5–4 || 27–7–1
|- align="center" bgcolor="#ffcccc"
| || at  || College Park • Charleston, SC || 3–4 || 27–8–1
|- align="center" bgcolor="#ccffcc"
| ||  || Gamecock Baseball Stadium • Columbia, SC || 5–0 || 28–8–1
|- align="center" bgcolor="#ccffcc"
| ||  || Gamecock Baseball Stadium • Columbia, SC || 7–2 || 29–8–1
|- align="center" bgcolor="#ffcccc"
| || at Georgia Southern || J.I. Clements Field • Statesboro, GA || 3–4 || 29–9–1
|- align="center" bgcolor="#ccffcc"
| || at Georgia Southern || J.I. Clements Field • Statesboro, GA || 9–1 || 30–9–1
|- align="center" bgcolor="#ccffcc"
| || The Citadel || Gamecock Baseball Stadium • Columbia, SC || 10–4 || 31–9–1
|- align="center" bgcolor="#ccffcc"
| || at Ferman || Ferman Baseball Stadium • Greenville, SC || 5–0 || 32–9–1
|- align="center" bgcolor="#ccffcc"
| || Baptist || Gamecock Baseball Stadium • Columbia, SC || 14–0 || 33–9–1
|-

|- align="center" bgcolor="#ccffcc"
| || at  || Foley Field • Athens, GA || 8–2 || 34–9–1
|- align="center" bgcolor="#ccffcc"
| || at  || Rose Bowl Field • Atlanta, GA || 8–2 || 35–9–1
|- align="center" bgcolor="#ccffcc"
| || at Georgia Tech || Rose Bowl Field • Atlanta, GA || 9–8 || 36–9–1
|- align="center" bgcolor="white"

|-
! style="" | Postseason (7–3)
|-

|- align="center" bgcolor="#ffcccc"
| ||  || Gamecocks Baseball Stadium • Columbia, SC || 6–7 || 36–10–1
|- align="center" bgcolor="#ccffcc"
| ||  || Gamecocks Baseball Stadium • Columbia, SC || 4–1 || 37–10–1
|- align="center" bgcolor="#ccffcc"
| || South Alabama || Gamecocks Baseball Stadium • Columbia, SC || 11–2 || 38–10–1
|- align="center" bgcolor="#ccffcc"
| ||  || Gamecocks Baseball Stadium • Columbia, SC || 5–2 || 39–10–1
|- align="center" bgcolor="#ccffcc"
| || Wake Forest || Gamecocks Baseball Stadium • Columbia, SC || 6–1 || 40–10–1
|-

|- align="center" bgcolor="#ccffcc"
| || vs  || Johnny Rosenblatt Stadium • Omaha, NE || 3–2 || 41–10–1
|- align="center" bgcolor="#ccffcc"
| || vs Cal State Los Angeles || Johnny Rosenblatt Stadium • Omaha, NE || 6–2 || 42–10–1
|- align="center" bgcolor="#ccffcc"
| || vs  || Johnny Rosenblatt Stadium • Omaha, NE || 5–4 || 43–10–1
|- align="center" bgcolor="#ffcccc"
| || vs Arizona State || Johnny Rosenblatt Stadium • Omaha, NE || 2–6 || 43–11–1
|- align="center" bgcolor="#ffcccc"
| || vs Arizona State || Johnny Rosenblatt Stadium • Omaha, NE || 1–2 || 43–12–1
|- align="center" bgcolor="white"

| Schedule Source:

Awards and honors 
Chuck McLean
All Tournament Team

Mookie Wilson
All Tournament Team

Randy Martz
All Tournament Team

Gamecocks in the 1977 MLB Draft
The following members of the South Carolina Gamecocks baseball program were drafted in the 1977 Major League Baseball Draft.

References

South Carolina
South Carolina Gamecocks baseball seasons
South Carolina Gamecocks baseball
College World Series seasons